Dede-Sutoy (Deede Sütei) is a rural locality (an ulus) in Selenginsky District, Republic of Buryatia, Russia. The population was 360 as of 2010. There are 21 streets.

Geography 
Dede-Sutoy is located 33 km east of Gusinoozyorsk (the district's administrative centre) by road. Tokhoy is the nearest rural locality.

References 

Rural localities in Selenginsky District